Philyra or Phillyra (: Ancient Greek: Φιλύρα means "linden-tree") is the name of three distinct characters in Greek mythology.

Philyra, an Oceanid and mother by Cronus of Chiron. 
 Philyra, one of the names given to the wife of Nauplius, who was the father of Palamedes, Oiax and Nausimedon. The mythographer Apollodorus reports that, in the Nostoi (Returns), an early epic from the Trojan cycle of poems about the Trojan War, Nauplius' wife was Philyra, and that according to Cercops his wife was Hesione, but that according to the "tragic poets" his wife was Clymene.
 Philyra or Phillyra, daughter of the river Asopus, and the mother of Hypseus by Peneius. The same source points out that phillyra's real name is Creusa is given instead of her.

Notes

References
 Pseudo-Apollodorus, The Library with an English Translation by Sir James George Frazer, F.B.A., F.R.S. in 2 Volumes, Cambridge, MA, Harvard University Press; London, William Heinemann Ltd. 1921. . Online version at the Perseus Digital Library. Greek text available from the same website.
 Gantz, Timothy, Early Greek Myth: A Guide to Literary and Artistic Sources, Johns Hopkins University Press, 1996, Two volumes:  (Vol. 1),  (Vol. 2).
 Grimal, Pierre, The Dictionary of Classical Mythology, Wiley-Blackwell, 1996. .
Hard, Robin, The Routledge Handbook of Greek Mythology: Based on H.J. Rose's "Handbook of Greek Mythology", Psychology Press, 2004, . Google Books.
Hesiod, Theogony, in The Homeric Hymns and Homerica with an English Translation by Hugh G. Evelyn-White, Cambridge, Massachusetts, Harvard University Press; London, William Heinemann Ltd. 1914. Online version at the Perseus Digital Library.
Hyginus, Gaius Julius, Fabulae, in The Myths of Hyginus, edited and translated by Mary A. Grant, Lawrence: University of Kansas Press, 1960. Online version at ToposText.
Tripp, Edward, Crowell's Handbook of Classical Mythology, Thomas Y. Crowell Co; First edition (June 1970). .

Characters in Greek mythology